The 1992 Formula One World Championship was the 46th season of FIA Formula One motor racing. It featured the 1992 Formula One World Championship for Drivers and the 1992 Formula One World Championship for Constructors, which were contested concurrently over a sixteen-race series that commenced on 1 March and ended on 8 November. Nigel Mansell won the Drivers' Championship, and Williams-Renault won the Constructors' Championship.

Mansell won the first five races of the season and went on to become the first driver in Formula One history to win nine races in a single season. Reigning champion Ayrton Senna won three races for McLaren-Honda but could only manage fourth in the championship, with Mansell's Williams teammate Riccardo Patrese finishing second and young Michael Schumacher third for Benetton-Ford.

Rule changes
Unleaded gasoline fuel became mandatory for all Formula One cars from the 1992 season onwards as leaded gasoline fuel was deemed too hazardous for health. Previously, unleaded gasoline fuel was optional for top teams only.

Drivers and constructors
The following teams and drivers competed in the 1992 FIA Formula One World Championship. All teams competed with tyres supplied by Goodyear.

Calendar

Calendar changes

The South African Grand Prix returned in 1992 after a 7-year absence due to the FIA lifting its ban on events in South Africa due to the end of Apartheid. The race was held again at Kyalami Grand Prix Circuit but there was a new layout compared to the last time they race in 1985.
The Mexican Grand Prix was moved from its mid-June date to March.
The Spanish Grand Prix was moved from September to May.
The Austrian Grand Prix, originally scheduled for 16 August was cancelled due to financial problems and replaced by the Hungarian Grand Prix which originally was to be held on 23 August.
The European Grand Prix, originally scheduled for 4 October at the Jerez circuit was cancelled.

Pre-season

The four major teams all kept at least one driver from 1991, with the two main title challengers both fielding unchanged driver lineups.

 McLaren kept reigning World Champion Ayrton Senna and Austrian Gerhard Berger from the 1991 season.
 Williams likewise retained Nigel Mansell and Riccardo Patrese.
 Ferrari replaced Alain Prost with Ivan Capelli.
 Benetton retained Michael Schumacher, now paired with Martin Brundle.

Further down the grid, the Jordan team took a risk by replacing both drivers after their successful debut season. Jordan also switched from Ford V8 engines and ran Yamaha V12s instead. Brabham went on to hire the first female F1 driver since Desiré Wilson in the 1980 season as the experienced but struggling British marque hired Giovanna Amati as its second driver. The impoverished Coloni team had been sold and renamed Andrea Moda Formula, a team that itself would become part of Formula One infamy.

This was the first of 2 seasons (the other being 1993) in Formula One's history where the calendar had races on all 6 inhabited continents (1 race each in Asia, Oceania, South America and Africa; 2 in North America and 10 in Europe).

In terms of safety, this season saw the introduction of stricter pre-season crash tests and the official use of a Safety Car in the sport.

Race-by-race

Race 1: South Africa

The season started off in South Africa at the newly rebuilt Kyalami circuit near the high altitude city of Johannesburg where Mansell took pole ahead of Senna, Berger, Patrese, Alesi and Schumacher. At the start, Patrese overtook both McLarens and Berger lost out to both Alesi and Schumacher as well. The order was: Mansell, Patrese, Senna, Alesi, Schumacher and Berger.

Mansell quickly pulled away from Patrese who was under no pressure at all from Senna. Brundle spun off on the first lap in the Benetton and then retired with a broken clutch. Alesi was well behind Senna and had a comfortable gap to Schumacher, whom Berger could do nothing about. The pit stops left the order unchanged, and it held until Alesi's engine failed on lap 41. Andrea de Cesaris was sixth and in the points for one lap until his engine failed as well.

Mansell won the race easily with Patrese making it a Williams 1–2 ahead of Senna, Schumacher, Berger and Johnny Herbert. Mansell had also won the previous South African Grand Prix, held in 1985, in a Williams-Honda.

Race 2: Mexico

The cancellation of the United States Grand Prix on a street circuit in Phoenix, Arizona, originally scheduled for 15 March left a 3-week gap between the first two races, and there was some controversy surrounding the next race in Mexico: the venue for this race, the Hermanos Rodríguez Autodrome in Mexico City (an even higher altitude city) had an appallingly bumpy track surface, thanks to the circuit being located on a geologically active area. It also had a dauntingly fast final corner called the Peraltada which was 180 degrees and banked. Although the banking had been eased from the previous year, making the corner slightly slower, the bumps were still disastrous as Ayrton Senna hit a nasty bump in the Esses and crashed into a concrete wall, receiving severe bruising. He was cleared fit enough to race.

The Williams cars were 1–2 in qualifying in Mexico ahead of the Benettons and the McLarens with Mansell on pole ahead of Patrese, Schumacher, Brundle, Berger and Senna. At the start, Senna blasted past his teammate and the Benettons with Brundle getting ahead of Schumacher. The order was: Mansell, Patrese, Senna, Brundle, Schumacher and Berger.

Schumacher quickly passed Brundle on lap 2 and soon afterwards there was a big queue behind Senna, who was apparently having some sort of trouble. Schumacher got past on lap 7 and the rest were relieved of being stuck up when Senna retired with transmission troubles on lap 11.

After the stops, Berger got ahead of Brundle only to be passed two laps later. Berger repassed Brundle on lap 36. Brundle got back ahead on lap 39 only for Berger to repass him two laps later. Brundle was back in fourth on lap 44 but retired with engine trouble three laps later, ending the battle for fourth. At the front, Mansell won with Patrese making it a Williams 1–2 again ahead of Schumacher, Berger, de Cesaris and Mika Häkkinen.

Race 3: Brazil

For the Brazilian Grand Prix at the Interlagos circuit in São Paulo, the Williamses were ahead of the McLarens with Mansell on pole ahead of Patrese with Senna third in front of his home crowd ahead of Berger, Schumacher and Alesi. On the parade lap, Berger stalled and had to start at the back. At the start, Mansell was poor and Patrese blasted ahead of him with Brundle getting ahead of Alesi. The order was: Patrese, Mansell, Senna, Schumacher, Brundle and Alesi.

Berger had to retire after only 4 laps in the pits with electrical failure. The Williamses pulled away while Senna was holding the rest at bay; Schumacher was 30 seconds behind by the time he had passed Senna for third on lap 13. Brundle and Alesi passed him soon afterwards and Senna retired with engine troubles on lap 17.

The stops brought Alesi closer to Brundle and Alesi made his move on lap 31. The two collided, with Brundle spinning out. This promoted Karl Wendlinger to fifth and he was there until his clutch failed on lap 56. As Thierry Boutsen collided with Érik Comas and forced Johnny Herbert off into the gravel at the Senna S as it forced both drivers to retire but Comas managed to continue, just 6 laps after Brundle's retirement. Meanwhile, Mansell pitted while passing back markers and took advantage of subsequent clear laps, taking over first place when Patrese pitted after slower laps passing more of the back markers.  Mansell then built a lead and won with a 29-second lead over Patrese in second, making it yet another Williams 1–2 ahead of Schumacher, Alesi, Capelli and Michele Alboreto.

Race 4: Spain

Mansell was on pole once again in Spain at the Catalunya circuit in Montmeló ahead of Schumacher, Senna, Patrese, Capelli and Brundle. At the start, in torrential wet conditions, Patrese got by Senna and Schumacher while Alesi sensationally climbed up from eighth to third. The order was: Mansell, Patrese, Alesi, Schumacher, Senna and Capelli.

Brundle retired yet again after spinning off on the main straight with a clutch problem by lap 5, meaning it was his 4th consecutive retirement. Schumacher attacked and passed Alesi on lap 7. Senna tried to do the same but tipped Alesi into a spin, putting the Frenchman behind Berger and Capelli as well. By now the rain intensified, and Patrese spun off on lap 20 while trying to lap a backmarker. This put Mansell ahead of Schumacher, Senna, Berger, Capelli and Alesi. Maurício Gugelmin as the only Jordan in the race, and lapped by the McLarens, had spun into the pit wall at lap 25.

During the pit-stops, Alesi got past Capelli and began to charge up through the field. He cruised past Berger for fourth and began to attack Senna for third. He wanted to attack Schumacher as well and was in a hurry. The pressure was so intense that Senna spun off with two laps to go. At the same time, Capelli spun off as well. Mansell won again from Schumacher, Alesi, Berger, Alboreto and Pierluigi Martini.

Race 5: San Marino

At the San Marino Grand Prix at the Imola circuit in Italy, the Williamses were still well ahead of the McLarens and the Benettons, Mansell taking another pole ahead of Patrese, Senna, Berger, Schumacher and Brundle. At the start, Patrese attacked Mansell but Mansell kept the lead and Schumacher got ahead of Berger to take fourth. The order at the end of the first lap was: Mansell, Patrese, Senna, Schumacher, Berger and Brundle.

As usual, Mansell was pulling away from Patrese as the two of them began to pull away from the field. Capelli in the second Ferrari spun off into the gravel trap on lap 12. Schumacher was pressurizing Senna but it was he who made the mistake first, spinning out into retirement on lap 21 with the result of rear suspension damage after clipping the tyre wall. Alesi was planning to go without a stop and so after the others stopped, he had climbed up to third. However, he was soon under pressure from the McLarens of Senna and Berger. Senna went ahead at Tosa on lap 40, but Berger tried to follow him through and Alesi lost momentum and spun towards Berger, taking both out.

Mansell made it five wins out of five with Patrese making it one more Williams 1–2 ahead of Senna, Brundle, Alboreto and Martini.

Race 6: Monaco

In Monaco, the Williamses were again dominant, with Mansell taking six poles in six with Patrese beside him, Senna third, Alesi fourth, Berger fifth and Schumacher sixth. At the start, Senna got ahead of Patrese while Schumacher took Alesi and Berger into the first corner. However, Alesi took fourth back at Mirabeau and then the race settled down. The order was: Mansell, Senna, Patrese, Alesi, Schumacher and Berger.

Patrese began to attack Senna but then began to drop back with gearbox troubles. On lap 12, Schumacher tried to pass Alesi and the two collided, and an electronic box was damaged in Alesi's car, with Schumacher getting ahead. Alesi continued to stay fifth for another 16 laps before the damage forced him to retire on lap 28. This promoted Berger to fifth, a place which he held for just under 5 laps before he had to retire from gearbox troubles.

On lap 60, Alboreto, just about to be lapped by Senna, spun in front of him and Senna lost another 10 seconds. Then, there was a loose wheelnut in Mansell's car and Mansell had to pit and rejoined behind Senna. He closed the gap quickly but with overtaking being extremely hard, Senna was able to legally block every move that Mansell made. Senna won from Mansell, Patrese, Schumacher, Brundle and Bertrand Gachot.

Race 7: Canada

There was a change in Circuit Gilles Villeneuve in Montreal, Canada with Senna taking his 61st career pole position ahead of Patrese, Mansell, Berger, Schumacher and Herbert. At the start, Mansell got ahead of Patrese and behind them Brundle was able to get by Herbert. The order was: Senna, Mansell, Patrese, Berger, Schumacher and Brundle.

The race settled down for the first 14 laps but then on lap 15, Mansell attacked Senna at the final chicane and hit a kerb, pushing his car into the air. It landed nose-first into the gravel and spun back onto the track. Mansell claimed that Senna had pushed him off the track. He was out and this forced Patrese to slow down and suddenly Berger went through to second. Senna then began to pull away from the field and the stops changed nothing. Senna still led Berger, Patrese, Schumacher, Brundle and Herbert. Herbert went out on lap 34 with clutch troubles.

Senna lost a certain victory when electrical failure put him out on lap 38. Behind them, Brundle passed Schumacher for third and this became second when Patrese's gearbox failed on lap 44. However, Brundle only lasted for two more laps before he retired with transmission trouble. Berger won from Schumacher, Alesi, Wendlinger, de Cesaris and Érik Comas.

Race 8: France

The Williamses took the front row at the Magny-Cours circuit in France ahead of the McLarens, with Mansell on pole ahead of Patrese, Senna, Berger, Schumacher and Alesi. At the start, Patrese got by Mansell while Berger got ahead of Senna and Brundle was able to pass Alesi. At the Adelaide hairpin, Schumacher tried to pass Senna but instead hit him, taking Senna out and forcing himself to pit. Meanwhile, Patrese and Mansell were side by side but Patrese kept the lead. Patrese led Mansell, Berger, Brundle, Alesi and Häkkinen and then Patrese waved Mansell through.

Nothing changed until lap 11 when Berger's engine failed. Soon afterwards it began to rain so heavily that the race was stopped. After some time the rain decreased and the grid formed up again. Patrese took the lead again with Alesi getting ahead of Häkkinen as well. Mansell tried to get past but Patrese defended and once again kept the lead. Patrese led Mansell, Brundle, Alesi, Häkkinen and Comas on aggregate. Patrese then waved Mansell through on track and soon Mansell got ahead on aggregate.

It began to rain again and everyone pitted for wets with Alesi going too late and dropping down to sixth. His engine failed on lap 61. Mansell won with Patrese making it a Williams 1–2 ahead of Brundle, Häkkinen, Comas and Herbert.

Thus, at the halfway stage of the season, Mansell was comfortably leading the championship with 66 points compared to Patrese's 34. Schumacher was third with 26, Senna was fourth with 18, Berger was fifth with 18, Alesi was sixth with 11, Brundle was seventh with 9 and Alboreto was eighth with 5.  The 66 points that Mansell had after the French Grand Prix would have been enough for him to have been crowned world champion even if he had scored no further points in the season; Patrese was the eventual runner-up with 56 points. In the Constructors' Championship, Williams were dominant, with 100 points and well ahead of the field. McLaren were second with 36, Benetton were third with 35, and Ferrari were fourth with 13.

This Grand Prix saw, for the first time in the sport, the trialing of a safety car, in this case a Ford Escort RS Cosworth.

Race 9: Great Britain

Mansell took pole position at Silverstone in Britain with Patrese making another Williams 1–2 ahead of Senna, Schumacher, Berger and Brundle. At the start, Patrese got ahead of Mansell while Brundle had a superb start, blasting by the three in front of him, and Schumacher also got ahead of Senna. Patrese waved Mansell through on the Hangar straight with action behind as both Senna and Berger got ahead of Schumacher. Schumacher quickly recovered and passed Berger at Priory before the first lap was over. Mansell led Patrese, Brundle, Senna, Schumacher and Berger.

Herbert became the first of the leaders to retire from 6th position in the leading Lotus with transmission problems on lap 32. Alesi in the leading Ferrari eventually went off the track with mechanical problems by lap 44. Senna put Brundle under pressure but Brundle kept the place. The round of stops changed nothing, with Mansell leading from Patrese, Brundle, Senna, Schumacher and Berger. Schumacher then went wide at a corner giving fifth to Berger. Senna only lasted until lap 53 when his transmission failed. On the next lap, Schumacher passed Berger who was suffering from engine trouble, but still managed to cross the line just before it let go and finished 5th.

Mansell took the win with Patrese making it one more Williams 1–2 ahead of Brundle, Schumacher, Berger and Häkkinen. Spectators began to invade the track to celebrate his win even before the final lap had finished, and thousands entered the track following the chequered flag. The win saw Mansell overtake Jackie Stewart as the most successful British driver, with 28 wins to Stewart's 27.

This Grand Prix also saw repeated trials for a safety car, first run at the preceding French Grand Prix.

Race 10: Germany

At Hockenheim in Germany, the Williamses were again ahead of the McLarens, with Mansell on pole ahead of Patrese, Senna, Berger, Alesi and home hero Schumacher. At the start, Mansell defended from Patrese while Alesi lost out to both Schumacher and a fast-starting Brundle. Mansell was leading Patrese, Senna, Berger, Schumacher and Brundle at the end of the first lap.

Mansell then pulled away from Patrese who was doing the same to the McLarens. Soon the stops came and everyone in the top pitted except Senna and the Benettons were planning to go without a stop. Berger had a slow stop and retired with a misfire soon after. The order after the stops was: Senna, Mansell, Schumacher, Patrese, Brundle and Alesi.

Mansell did not want to stay second and passed Senna to lead with Patrese taking third from Schumacher soon after. Patrese was on a charge and smashed the lap record in his chase of  Senna. He was right with Senna on the penultimate lap and tried to attack on the last lap. But Patrese in his attempt spun off into the gravel trap and was out. Mansell took his eighth win of the season ahead of Senna, Schumacher, Brundle, Alesi and Comas.

Race 11: Hungary

By the time the Hungarian Grand Prix in Mogyoród came around, Mansell was 46 points ahead of Patrese and the Williams team were 77 points ahead of Benetton with 6 races to go. This was the chance for Williams to seal both titles and they were dominant, but it was Patrese who took pole ahead of Mansell, Senna, Schumacher, Berger and Brundle. At the start, Berger got by Schumacher and then Mansell lost momentum and Senna passed him with Berger following his teammate through. The order was: Patrese, Senna, Berger, Mansell, Schumacher and Brundle.

There was a collision on the first lap between Comas, Herbert, Boutsen and Tarquini who all retired on the first lap (meaning both Ligiers of Comas and Boutsen retired on the first lap), before Van de Poole spun into retirement at the first corner on lap 3 as both Fondmetals retired after only 2 laps. Mansell passed Berger on lap 8 and set off after Senna. However, as hard as he tried, the combination of the small circuit and Senna's skills in defending meant that he could not pass. Alesi in the leading Ferrari behind the leading pack spun out with the rear wheels in the gravel trap by lap 15. On lap 31, Patrese made a mistake and went wide and rejoined behind Berger. Two laps later, Mansell passed Berger to get back third. Then, a pivotal movement came on lap 39 when Patrese spun off. He rejoined in seventh, outside the points which meant that Mansell would be the world champion if results stayed the same. However, on lap 51, Mansell had to go to the pits with tyre troubles and rejoined in sixth, just ahead of Patrese. Mansell quickly passed Häkkinen but before Patrese, who was right behind, could take sixth, Patrese's engine blew. He was out and would get no points.

Mansell quickly caught and passed Brundle on lap 60 and four laps later, he was up to third when Schumacher's rear wing broke, spinning him out and retired on lap 64. Senna, a minute ahead, made a precautionary stop just as Häkkinen passed Brundle for fourth. Mansell passed Berger for second and now had a toehold on the championship. Soon afterwards, Häkkinen tried to pass Berger and spun into Brundle's path. Brundle was forced to spin to avoid a collision and both rejoined without losing places, with Häkkinen staying ahead. Senna won ahead of new world champion Mansell, Berger, Häkkinen, Brundle and Capelli.

Race 12: Belgium

Now to Spa-Francorchamps in Belgium and champion-elect Mansell took pole ahead of Senna, Schumacher, Patrese, Alesi and Berger. At the start, it was damp and Senna outdragged Mansell with Patrese getting ahead of Schumacher while Berger did not move. Senna was leading Mansell, Patrese, Schumacher, Alesi and Thierry Boutsen.

At the start before La Source, Berger failed to get away and retired after an immediate transmission problem & put him out straight away. Mansell attacked and passed Senna at the end of the second lap with Patrese following suit. Then it began to rain and almost everybody pitted for wets. Senna stayed out in the hope that the rain would stop but it did not. He pitted late and rejoined down in 12th as Alesi went out with a puncture after colliding with Mansell at La Source. The order was: Mansell, Patrese, Schumacher, Brundle, Häkkinen and Boutsen. Capelli suffered a dramatic engine failure on lap 26 as he went straight off into the gravel trap at Blanchimont whilst battling Herbert for 6th position. The track was beginning to dry and Boutsen spun off on lap 28. Schumacher lost two seconds after going off the track and stopped for dries at the end of the lap. However, Mansell and Patrese stayed out far too long and when both pitted late, they rejoined behind Schumacher. Herbert eventually retired yet again with engine problems on lap 43, the Englishman would be classified 13th.

Mansell tried to close in but cracked an exhaust and dropped back. Patrese suffered the same fate and had to hold back Brundle. Behind, the recovering Senna took fifth from Häkkinen. Schumacher took his maiden win ahead of Mansell, Patrese, Brundle, Senna and Häkkinen. The Constructors' Championship went to Williams after their 2–3 finish. This was also the only race to have 18 classified finishers, the highest number of finishers that year.

Thus, with three-quarters of the season over, Mansell was the World Champion with 98 points, with Patrese second with 44, Schumacher third with 43, Senna fourth with 36, Berger fifth with 24, Brundle sixth with 21, Alesi seventh with 13, and Häkkinen eighth with 9. Williams were the World Champion in the Constructors' Championship with 142 points, with Benetton second with 64, McLaren third with 60, and Ferrari fourth with 16.

Race 13: Italy

At Monza in Italy, Mansell was on pole ahead of Senna, Alesi, Berger, Patrese and Schumacher. At the start, Mansell took off while Patrese got ahead of Alesi and Berger lost out to Schumacher, Capelli and Brundle. Mansell led Senna, Patrese, Alesi, Schumacher and Capelli.

Mansell pulled away fast with Senna holding up Patrese. On lap 13, both Ferraris went out: Alesi with trouble in his fuel system and Capelli with electrical problems. Patrese then passed Senna but Mansell was already 10 seconds up the road. Then, everybody stopped during which Brundle got ahead of Schumacher. The order was: Mansell, Patrese, Senna, Brundle, Schumacher and Berger. Then Mansell suddenly slowed down and allowed Patrese to pass him.

Then, on lap 36, he began to drop back with hydraulic troubles. Senna, Brundle, Schumacher and Berger all passed him. He trolled round and retired in the pits on lap 41. Patrese led but then Senna began to close in. Patrese also began to suffer from hydraulic troubles and Senna passed him on lap 49. On the next lap, both Brundle and Schumacher found a way through. Patrese held fourth until the last lap when Berger passed him. Senna won from Brundle, Schumacher, Berger, the hobbling Patrese and de Cesaris.

Race 14: Portugal

The Williamses were again ahead of the McLarens and the Benettons in Estoril just outside Lisbon with Mansell on pole ahead of Patrese, Senna, Berger, Schumacher and Brundle. At the start, Schumacher was late firing up and started at the back of the grid. At the start, Berger got ahead of Senna. Mansell led from Patrese, Berger, Senna, Brundle and Häkkinen.

Herbert in the 2nd Lotus collided with Alesi on the first lap, Herbert eventually crashed out on lap 3 as Alesi in the leading Ferrari had spun off by lap 13, making it his 4th retirement in a row. Then it was the usual sight of Mansell pulling away from Patrese and the two getting away from the rest. The Williamses pitted early unlike the McLarens. Mansell had a quick stop and rejoined in the lead but Patrese had a problem with his right rear jack and joined behind the McLarens. He passed Senna quickly and set off after Berger. On lap 35, the recovering Schumacher took sixth from Alboreto. Soon after, Patrese was right with Berger, looking for a way through.

Berger realised that he had blistered his tyres and slowed down as he was about to go to the pits. Patrese was caught unawares, hit the back of Berger and had a massive crash. Luckily, Patrese was unhurt. Schumacher hit the debris and had to pit again, dropping back to eighth. Mansell took his 30th career win ahead of Berger, Senna, Brundle, Häkkinen and Alboreto.

With two more races to go, Mansell was already World Champion with 108 points but there was a big battle for second. Senna was second with 50, Schumacher was third with 47, Patrese was fourth with 46, Berger was fifth with 33, Brundle was sixth with 30, Alesi was seventh with 13, and Häkkinen was eighth with 11. In the Constructors' Championship, Williams was the World Champion with 154 points. McLaren was second with 83, Benetton was third with 77, and Ferrari was fourth with 16.

Race 15: Japan

Before the race at Suzuka in Japan, Ferrari had dropped Capelli who had a poor season and replaced him with Nicola Larini. In qualifying, the Williamses showed their class with Mansell taking pole ahead of Patrese, Senna, Berger, Schumacher and Herbert. At the start, there were no changes at the front and Mansell still led Patrese, Senna, Berger, Schumacher and Herbert.

Senna did not last long, going out with engine troubles on lap 3. Gouillard had crashed out in the second Tyrrell by lap 6. Berger decided to make an early stop and dropped back down to sixth. Schumacher had gearbox troubles and retired at the end of lap 13. Herbert now inherited third  only to go out with the same problems two laps later. Berger and Brundle who stopped earlier did not stop when the others did and so the order after the stops was: Mansell, Patrese, Berger, Häkkinen, Brundle and Comas.

On lap 36, Mansell slowed down and let Patrese through before again speeding up and hanging on Patrese's tail. However, on lap 45, an engine failure ended Mansell's race. At the same time, Häkkinen went out with the same problem. Patrese won from Berger, Brundle, de Cesaris, Alesi and Christian Fittipaldi.

Race 16: Australia

For the season's final race on the streets of Adelaide, Australia, Mansell took pole ahead of Senna, Patrese, Berger, Schumacher and Alesi. At the start, Alesi had to hold off Brundle and there were no changes ahead of him. The order was: Mansell, Senna, Patrese, Berger, Schumacher and Alesi.

There was a collision at the start behind the leaders as Grouillard's Tyrrell collided with the Dallara of Martini on the first lap (eliminating both drivers on the same lap). However, Mansell did not pull away as usual. Senna was right with him and tried to pass him on lap 8. Gugelmin had once again spun out and crashed in the second Jordan by lap 9. He went wide and Mansell retained the lead. The top two were pulling away from Patrese and the rest but Senna could not attack Mansell. The gap stayed at less than a second. Then, on lap 19, entering the final corner, Senna crashed into the back of Mansell resulting in both drivers retiring. Some claimed that Mansell 'brake tested' Senna.

Patrese was now leading under immense pressure from Berger. Berger tried to pass around the outside but he too went wide. While Patrese did not pit, Berger pitted, followed 5 laps later by Schumacher. Berger rejoined 4 seconds ahead. Behind them, Brundle had got ahead of Alesi in the stops. On lap 51, Patrese, nearly 20 seconds ahead, coasted to a halt with an engine failure. So, Berger won with Schumacher close behind ahead of Brundle, Alesi, Boutsen (the last time the Belgian would score points) and Stefano Modena, this race was remembered for being Modena's last Grand Prix and the only point for the Jordan team that season.

Season result
At the end of the season, Mansell was named world champion with 108 points with Patrese edging out the battle for second with 56, Schumacher third with 53, Senna fourth with 50, Berger fifth with 49, Brundle sixth with 38, Alesi seventh with 18 and Häkkinen eighth with 11. In the Constructors' Championship, Williams was dominant champion with 164 points, McLaren just edging out second with 99, Benetton a close third with 91, and Ferrari fourth with 21.

Results and standings

Grands Prix

Points scoring system

Points were awarded to the top six finishers in each race as follows:

World Drivers' Championship standings

Notes:
 – Driver did not finish the Grand Prix but was classified, as they completed more than 90% of the race distance.

World Constructors' Championship standings

Notes:
 – Driver did not finish the Grand Prix but was classified, as they completed more than 90% of the race distance.

Non-championship event results
The 1992 season also included a single event which did not count towards the World Championship, the Formula One Indoor Trophy at the Bologna Motor Show.

References

External links

 formula1.com – 1992 official driver standings (archived)
 formula1.com – 1992 official team standings (archived)
 1992 Formula One results and images at f1-facts.com

Formula One seasons